Ash Springs is an unincorporated community in the Pahranagat Valley of Lincoln County, Nevada.  The community's principal industry is ranching. Ash Springs is named for the desert ash trees growing nearby.

Hot springs
Ash Springs is home to naturally occurring hot springs. The hot springs are located on BLM land. The water emerges from several springs at a temperature of 97 °F/36 °C, and cools to 95 °F as it flows into a large mineral water soaking pool approximately 15 feet in diameter.

Gallery

References

Unincorporated communities in Nevada
Unincorporated communities in Lincoln County, Nevada
Hot springs of Nevada